This is an alphabetical list of GoBots characters with information on their appearances, fictional biographies and histories.

Bad Boy 

Bad Boy is one of Cy-Kill's minions. He is a rough street punk always ready with an insult and looking for a fight. He is actually smarter than he lets on, preferring to let others underestimate him.

Like most Gobots, Bad Boy can change form, his alternate mode being a combat jet. He also has hand-blasters. His built-in repair systems can repair most injuries to his body if given enough energy.

Animated series 
Bad Boy is featured extensively in "Wolf in the Fold" episode #30. Using an image simulator circuit invented by Herr Fiend, Bad Boy is able to go under cover as the Guardian Heat Seeker. From inside the Guardians Bad Boy is able to leak information to the Renegades. Once it is discovered that there is a traitor among the Guardians Bad Boy tries to frame Leader-1 as the traitor, but he is uncovered by Scooter. Thanks to timely use of the astrobeam he escapes the Guardians.

Bad Boy appears in "Cy-Kill Escapes" episode #41 as he and Herr Fiend send a stealth device to the escaping renegades on the Gobot Prison Moon to cover their escape in a hidden ship.

Bad Boy appears in "The Fall of Gobotron" episode #43 as he and Block Head try to pick a fight with Turbo.

Bad Boy appears in "Flight to Earth" episode #44 where he and Block Head collect the Guardians on Gobotron and take them to prison.

Bad Boy appears in "The Third Column" episode #50 where he sides with Zero, who tries to take over the Renegades from Cy-Kill.

Bad Boy and Cop-Tur are sent to attack Unicom bases and distract the Guardians while Cy-Kill, Crasher and Scorp attempt to take the Power Suits from the Strategic Command Center.

Fun Publications 
Bad Boy has a cameo in Transcendent by Fun Publications which occurred at the same time as Withered Hope. He can be seen standing in line for processing in Axiom Nexus.

Bad Boy is a main character appearing in Withered Hope, a text and comic based story. Sent to investigate the effect the destroying their universe six Gobots are reformatted to look like an Autobots and Decepticons and sent through the Interfacer to the source of the disturbance - the 22nd level. They accidentally arrive on Transtech Cybertron where they are kept against their will in the city of Axiom Nexus. Bug Bite escapes without his allies using an astro beam device. While on Cybertron Bad Boy becomes friends with the Malignus gang. The remaining Gobots run afoul of the Transtech Decepticon General Demolishor in a criminal investigation but are aided by Airazor, Crystal Widow and Cheetor. The Gobots receive upgrades from the shop of Swindle, Swindle and Swindle and are able to leave the dimension thanks to stolen transit passes they obtain. Once they arrive on Earth of the 22nd level where they find Bug Bite and his new Decepticon allies Weirdwolf and Dreadwind.

Toys 
Two toys were produced for Bad Boy. The first was released as a Gobot, based on the Machine Robo line from Japan. The second was a recolor of the Transformer Powerglide, released in Japan as an ehobby exclusive.

Bent Wing 
Bent Wing was one of the names in a word find that had to be solved to win a copy of the Challenge of the Gobots video game from Your Sinclair magazine.

Blaster 

Blaster, also known as RocketMan, is a Guardian Gobot who turns into a missile launcher.

Animated series 
Blaster appeared in the episode "The Third Column" where he works in a Guardian weapons facility that was attacked by the Renegades. The attack was turned away by automated defenses.

Bug Bite 
Bug Bite is a Renegade who has also appeared in the Transformers franchise as a recolor of the Autobot Bumblebee.

Bugsie 
Bugsie was one of the names in a word find that had to be solved to win a copy of the Challenge of the Gobots video game from Your Sinclair magazine.

BuggyMan 

BuggyMan, or simply Buggy, is a Renegade Gobot who turns into a dune buggy. Some fiction refers to him as "Buggy Boy".

Animated series 
BuggyMan appeared in the Challenge of the Gobots episode #5, "The Final Conflict" where he was among the Renegades captured on Gobotron.

BuggyMan appears in "Flight to Earth" episode #44. He and Geeper-Creeper chase Scooter and Sparky on Gobotron.

Scooter and Small Foot join Nick and A.J. to watch a car stunt show which is attacked by Crasher, BuggyMan and Fly Trap. Small Foot fights BuggyMan and defeats him, but the Renegades regain the upper hand until the Guardians are rescued by Leader-1 and Turbo who arrive in their Power Suits

Cop-Tur

Crasher

Creepy 

Creepy is a renegade loyal to Cy-Kill who turns into a scorpion-like monster.

Animated series 
Creepy, Scorp and Vamp aided the Master Renegade from escaping his imprisonment by Cy-Kill on Roguestar.

Comics 
Creepy appeared in the story "Scooter's Mighty Magnet" as one of Cy-Kill's minions.

Toys 
While a purple version of Creepy was sold in stores, a special green version was offered as a mail-away exclusive by sending in UPCs from four Gobots.

Cy-Kill

Dozer 

Dozer was one of the names in a word find that had to be solved to win a copy of the Challenge of the Gobots video game from Your Sinclair magazine.

Animated series 
The Guardians set up a lab to test their power suits on Earth. With Defendor and Blaster patrolling the lab Baron Von Joy and Path Finder test a new suit on Dozer.

Dozer appeared in the episode "The Third Column."

Dumper 

DumperMan, or simply  Dumper, is a fictional character in the Gobots toyline, and the subsequent Challenge of the Gobots cartoon that transforms from a Guardian into a dump truck.

Dumper was one of the names in a word find that had to be solved to win a copy of the Challenge of the Gobots video game from Your Sinclair magazine.

Reception 
Dumper was chosen as the 9th goofiest Gobot name by Topless Robot.

Animated series 
The Guardians set up a lab to test their power suits on Earth. Cy-Kill, Cop-Tur, Crasher, Geeper-Creeper, Pincher, and Snoop attacked the lab, but it was defended by Leader-1, Baron Von Joy, Blaster, Dozer, Dumper, Road Ranger, Scooter, Scratch and Turbo. Although the Guardians were winning the battle, an accidental backfire from Baron Von Joy's weapon allowed the Renegades to escape.

Books 
Dumper was featured in the 1986 children's book Collision Course Comet - Robo Machine Featuring The Challenge Of Gobots where he fought the Renegade Gobot Crasher.

Toys 
 Gobots Dumper (1983)

Fitor

Geeper-Creeper 

Geeper-Creeper, also known as JeepMan, was one of the Renegade followers of Cy-Kill.

Animated series 
Geeper-Creeper first appears in the series pilot.

Geeper-Creeper appeared in the Challenge of the Gobots episode #5, "The Final Conflict" where he was among the Renegades captured on Gobotron.

In "It's The Thought That Counts" episode #6, Cy-Kill, Cop-Tur, Crasher, Geeper-Creeper, Pincher, and Snoop attack a lab, but it is defended by Leader-1, Baron Von Joy, Blaster, Dozer, Dumper, Road Ranger, Scooter, Scratch and Turbo. Although the Guardians are winning the battle, an accidental backfire from Baron Von Joy's weapon allows the Renegades to escape.

In "The Fall of Gobotron" episode #43 after Cy-Kill takes over Gobotron, Geeper-Creeper and Slicks are assigned to guard the modifier. They are lured away by Scooter and lead into a Guardian ambush by Turbo, Small Foot and Sparky.

Geeper-Creeper appears in "Flight to Earth" episode #44. He and BuggyMan chase Scooter and Sparky on Gobotron.

In "Destroy All Guardians" episode #47, Geeper-Creeper and Tank are seen among Cy-Kill's guards on the Roguestar. He also appears in "Escape from Elba" episode #48. In "Clutch of Doom" episode #50, Geeper-Creeper is among the Renegades who put the captured Guardians Blaster and Van Guard in prison. Geeper-Creeper appears in "The Third Column" episode #51 where he sides with Zero, who tries to take over the Renegades from Cy-Kill.

Grungy 
Grungy Courageous is a Power Warrior and the Renegade copy and brother of Courageous forged by Renegade-augmenting Power Suits and their central spaceship.

Reception 
Grungy was chosen as the 3rd goofiest Gobot name by Topless Robot.

Herr Fiend 

Herr Fiend is the name of a fictional character from the various Gobots series. He is an evil Renegade scientist and also known as Doctor Go.

Herr Fiend is one of the Renegades. He is the resident Renegade mad scientist, and is depicted as speaking with a thick German accent.

His alternate mode of a Porsche 928 is identical to the Decepticon Transformers named Dead End.

Animated series 
In the animated Gobots series Herr Fiend is given the name "Doctor Go."

Doctor Go appears in "Battle for Gobotron" episode #1. Due to animation errors the Renegade Doctor Go appears identical to Zeemon in the pilot series.

In "Doppleganger" episode #23 Cy-Kill has Doctor Go program robot duplicates of the Guardians using recordings he made of the real Guardians. When demonstrating the Space Bender weapon to Unicom, Leader-1 learns that the Renegades are attacking Washington. The Renegades ambush Leader-1 and replace him with his duplicate. Leading the Command Center back to Gobotron and getting rid of Scooter and Small Foot the Renegades then release duplicates of Path Finder, Rest-Q, Van Guard and Turbo. Small Foot and Scooter are able to capture the Turbo duplicate and learn where their friends are being held. Cy-Kill then replaces Good Night. Using the duplicate Turbo the Guardians infiltrate the Renegade base, free the captured Guardians and escape from Spoons and Fitor. Although blocked by the Renegades, Scooter uses a hologram of Zod to make the Renegades flee. Making it back to Gobotron the Guardians are attacked by the Guardian duplicates. The real Guardians are able to defeat their duplicates with the aid of the real Zeemon, Hans-Cuff and Rest-Q. Cy-Kill then arrives in the Thruster with more duplicates, but Small Foot is able to stop with robots using the Space Bender device, which fuses their robot brains.

Doctor Go and Bad Boy send a stealth device to the escaping renegades on the Gobot Prison Moon to cover their escape in a hidden ship.

Doctor Go appears in the feature film GoBots: Battle of the Rock Lords where he uses the brain stormer on the female Rock Lord Solitaire. Due to animation errors in the film Doctor Go appears to resemble Baron Von Joy in the film, meanwhile in some scenes the Guardian Zeemon appears is occasionally depicted like Doctor Go.

Toys 
 ''Gobots Super Gobot Herr Fiend (1984)
 Based on the Machine Robo line. Turns into a Porsche 928S.

 Hornet 
Hornet was among the Renegade Gobot forces who aided the Rock Lord Magmar on the planet Quartex.

 Leader-1 

Leader-1 is the name of several fictional characters from the Go-Bots, Robo Machines and Transformers media properties. In the GoBots universe, Leader-1, also known as F-15Man, is the leader of the Guardians. In the Transformers universe Leader-1 was the partnered Mini-Con to Megatron.

 Loco 

Loco, also known as TrainMan, is one of the soldiers of Cy-Kill.  The word "loco" means "crazy" in Spanish.

Loco was one of the names in a word find that had to be solved to win a copy of the Challenge of the Gobots video game from Your Sinclair magazine.

 Animated series 
Loco was a long-serving Renegade, fighting in the defence of the Renegades' fortress on Gobotron. He was used sporadically after that, most notably helping the cyborg arms dealer Trident hijack a shipment of UNICOM materials. Loco appeared in "Renegade Carnival" episode 52.

 Eagle Comics 
Loco appeared in the Eagle Comics story The Robo Machines. He is a member of the Renegade Robo Machines working for Strom Domez.

 Toy 
Loco's toy was a re-release of the Machine Robo Steam Robo figure (MR-05). It was first issued in 1983, and was available until the end of 1984. It was also released in Europe.

 Monstrous 
Monstrous, or Monsterous with an "E", is a Renegade made up of six Renegades who combine to turn into a monster.

 Night Ranger 
Night Ranger, also known as HarleyMan, is a Guardian Gobot who turns into a police motorcycle. This toy was the inspiration for the Transformers character Backtrack.

 Reception 
Night Ranger was chosen as the 10th goofiest Gobot name by Topless Robot.

 Path Finder 

 Pincher 

Pincher is a Renegade Gobot spy voiced by Peter Cullen.

Pincher was one of the names in a word find that had to be solved to win a copy of the Challenge of the Gobots video game from Your Sinclair magazine.

 Animated series 
Cy-Kill, Cop-Tur, Crasher, Geeper-Creeper, Pincher, and Snoop attack a lab, but it is defended by Leader-1, Baron Von Joy, Blaster, Dozer, Dumper, Road Ranger, Scooter, Scratch and Turbo. Although the Guardians were winning the battle, an accidental backfire from Baron Von Joy's weapon allows the Renegades to escape.
Pincher's robot body was possibly once possessed by a Guardian essence, but then, it was captured and remade and had its essence switched with that of Pincher by Herr Fiend.

Pincher was among the Renegade Gobot forces who aided the Rock Lord Magmar on the planet Quartex.

 Psycho 

Psychoroid, or simply Psycho, is a Renegade. His design is based on the Future Machine from Japanese manga series Cobra, which became the anime series Cobra: Space Adventure.

 Animated series 
Psycho cameo in "The Battle for Gobotron", and a short but memorable scene in "The Gobotron Saga", where he got to conduct the disassembling of Leader-1. He also appeared on the cover to the VHS release of "Cy-Kill's Shrinking Ray."

 Books 
Psycho is ordered by Cy-Kill to issue the Renegade retreat.

 Pumper 
PumperMan, or simply Pumper, is a Guardian who turns into a fire engine and served on Command Center 6.

 Reception 
Pumper was chosen as the 8th goofiest Gobot name by Topless Robot.

 Puzzler 

Man Gobot Puzzler is a Renegade Gobot made up of six other Renegade cars who combine into one gigantic robot.

Puzzler was initially solicited as a Guardian.

 Animated series 
Puzzler appears in "Auto Madic" episode #28, where the Guardians don Power Suits to form the Power Warrior Courageous, which defeats Puzzler.

 Rest-Q 

Rest-Q, also known as AmbulanceMan, is the Guardian medic.

 Animated series 
In "It's The Thought That Counts" episode 6 Scooter is briefly captured by the Renegades. After being freed Rest-Q checks out Scooter, but Scooter refused to be examined, secretly being brainwashed by the Renegades. Rest-Q appeared in "Ultra Zod" episode 14, where he donned a Power Suit and helped form the Power Warrior Courageous, which defeated Ultra Zod. In "Doppleganger" episode 23 leading the Command Center back to Gobotron and getting rid of Scooter and Small Foot the Renegades then released duplicates of Path Finder, Rest-Q, Van Guard and Turbo. Later the real Guardians were able to defeat their duplicates with the aid of the real Zeemon, Hans-Cuff and Rest-Q. Rest-Q appeared in "Cy-Kill Escapes" episode 41. He repaired Hans-Cuff, who was injured in the Renegade prison break. In "The Fall of Gobotron" episode 43 Rest-Q repaired Small Foot. Rest-Q appeared in "Flight to Earth" episode 44. Captured by the Renegades, Rest-Q was not even allowed to repair the other prisoner Guardians, instead being threatened by Twin Spin with his blades. He was later rescued by Scooter and Sparky.

Rest-Q appeared in GoBots: Battle of the Rock Lords.

 Eagle Comics 
Rest-Q appeared in the Eagle Comics story The Robo Machines. He is a member of the Security Force Robo Machines.

 Road Ranger Road Ranger, also known as TruckMan or simply Truck, is a fictional character from the various Gobots series and later became part of the Transformers series. He is a heroic Guardian Gobot who turns into a flatbed trailer truck and was introduced in 1984.

Road Ranger is one of the Guardians Go-Bots, he later disguises himself as an Autobot. Road Ranger's alternate mode is that of a semi-trailer truck. He can fly in robot mode and has hand-mounted blasters.

 Animated series 
Road Ranger first appears in "Wolf in the Fold" episode #30 of Challenge of the Gobots.

Road Ranger appears in "The Third Column" episode #42, where he works in a Guardian weapons facility that was attacked by the Renegades. The attack was turned away by automated defenses.

In episode #58, "It's The Thought That Counts" Cy-Kill, Cop-Tur, Crasher, Geeper-Creeper, Pincher, and Snoop attack the lab, but it is defended by Leader-1, Baron Von Joy, Blaster, Dozer, Dumper, Road Ranger, Scooter, Scratch and Turbo. Although the Guardians are initially winning the battle, an accidental backfire from Baron Von Joy's weapon allows the Renegades to escape.

 Fun Publications 
Road Ranger has a cameo in Transcendent which occurred at the same time as Withered Hope. He can be seen standing in line for processing in Axiom Nexus.

Road Ranger, is a main character appearing in Fun Publications fiction Withered Hope, a text and comic based story. Sent to investigate the effect the destroying their universe six Gobots are reformatted to look like an Autobots and Decepticons and sent through the Interfacer to the source of the disturbance - the 22nd level. They accidentally arrive on Transtech Cybertron where they are kept against their will in the city of Axiom Nexus. Bug Bite escapes without his allies using an astro beam device. The remaining Gobots run afoul of the Transtech Decepticon General Demolishor in a criminal investigation but are aided by Airazor, Crystal Widow and Cheetor. The Gobots receive upgrades from the shop of Swindle, Swindle and Swindle and are able to leave the dimension thanks to stolen transit passes they obtain. Once they arrive on Earth of the 22nd level where they find Bug Bite and his new Decepticon allies Weirdwolf and Dreadwind.

 Books 
Road Ranger appeared in the 1985 Robo Machine book The Wagner Sirens.

 Eagle Comics 
Road Ranger appeared under the name Truck in the Eagle Comics story The Robo Machines. He is a member of the Security Force Robo Machines.

 Toys 
 Gobots Road Ranger (1984)
 Turns into a semi-truck with flatbed.
 Generation 1 Mini-Vehicle Road Ranger (2004)
 Road Ranger is an e-hobby exclusive. He is a redeco of Generation 1 Huffer.

 Scooter 

 Scorp 

Scorp is a Renegade Gobot loyal to the Master Renegade.

 Animated series 
Creepy, Scorp and Vamp aided the Master Renegade from escaping his imprisonment by Cy-Kill on Roguestar.

 Small Foot Small Foot is a fictional character from the various Gobots series and later became part of the Transformers universes. Her name is a parody of the famous monster truck Bigfoot.

Small Foot is a female Gobot. Small Foot is one of Leader-1's most trusted soldiers. A tracker, what she lacks in size she more than makes up for in heart and determination.  Small Foot can often be seen kicking around with Scooter but she idolizes Leader-1 and is often found fighting by his side.  Trouble often finds her wherever she is.  Sometimes with all of her determination Small Foot becomes impulsive and eager to please the older and more experienced Guardian soldiers.

In robot mode, she can fire energy shots from the two lamps on her chest. She converts into a Toyota Hilux SR5. She uses a tow cable with a hook in both modes.

Small Foot was featured in one of the early Gobots commercials.

The Autobot Small Foot is based on the Gobots characters of the same name.

 Animated series 
Small Foot makes her debut in the episode "Trident's Triple Threat". Small Foot's impulsiveness runs away with her in this episode when she tries to take on three Renegades at once. Crasher, and Cop-Tur beat her up so severely that Turbo has to carry her back to their base in his arms.

Small Foot's impulsiveness almost cost her life when the Guardians accidentally released the Master Renegade thinking that he was the Last Engineer. The Master Renegade took Small Foot hostage and kept the other Guardians at bay while he tried to fly away in their command center with Crasher. With Turbo's help Small Foot escaped from the Master Renegade but she paid a terrible price. Rest-Q checked out all of Small Foot's internal structures and was shocked when he discovered that Small Foot's transforming protocol was completely gone after the initial carnage that was inflicted upon her by the Master Renegade.  It was as if Small Foot never went through the modifier, a machine that gives Gobots the ability to transform into vehicles after they leave the Guardian Academy, leading Matt Hunter to ask if Small Foot can be put through the modifier again. Rest-Q warns that such a thing has never been done before but there are no other options.  Baron Von Joy and Rest-Q look on as Small Foot's transformation mechanism is repaired.  When the job is done, Baron Von Joy asks Small Foot if she can transform.  When she does she takes Matt, Nick, and A.J. back the Guardian HQ so that she may get to her battle station.  However, the lone Gobot who was later joined by Scooter and Turbo never made it back to base.  Instead the Renegades blasted a hole in the ground in front of them and Small Foot and Turbo crashed through a wall and stopped short of another wall while poor Scooter could not stop and slammed into a glass partition.  It is within the glass partition that the Guardian trio and their human companions found the man that they believed is The Last Engineer and brought him back to Guardian H.Q.

Small Foot is among the Go-Bots who defend their world against the bug-like invaders in "Invasion from the 21st Level" episode #21-22.

Cy-Kill, Cop-Tur, Crasher and Snoop attacked Leader-1, Turbo, Scooter and Small Foot. Crasher wounded Small Foot. After attaining recordings of the Guardians the Renegades retreated. Using the recordings Cy-Kill had Herr Fiend program robot duplicates of the Guardians. When demonstrating Space Bender weapon to Unicom, Leader-1 learned that the Renegades were attacking Washington. The Renegades ambushed Leader-1 and replaced him with his duplicate. Leading the Command Center back to Gobotron and getting rid of Scooter and Small Foot; the Renegades then released duplicates of Path Finder, Rest-Q, Van Guard and Turbo. Small Foot and Scooter were able to capture the Turbo duplicate and learn where their friends were being held. Cy-Kill then replaced Good Night. Using the duplicate Turbo the Guardians infiltrated the Renegade base, freed the captured Guardians and escape from Spoons and Fitor. Although blocked by the Renegades, Scooter used a hologram of Zod to make the Renegades flee. Making it back to Gobotron the Guardians were attacked by the Guardian duplicates. The real Guardians were able to defeat their duplicates with the aid of the real Zeemon, Hans-Cuff and Rest-Q. Cy-Kill then arrived in the Thruster with more duplicates, but Small Foot was able to stop with robots using the Space Bender, which would fuse their robot brains.

In "Scooter Enhanced" episode #24 Scooter and Small Foot join Nick and A.J. to watch a car stunt show which is attacked by Crasher, BuggyMan and Fly Trap. Small Foot fights BuggyMan and defeats him, but the Renegades regain the upper hand until the Guardians are rescued by Leader-1 and Turbo who arrive in Power Suits. Cy-Kill vowes to gain Power Suits for the Renegades. Scooter decides he needs more firepower, so he has Baron Von Joy remove his damaged holo projector in favor of a blaster unit. Screw Head, Bad Boy and Cop-Tur are sent to attack Unicom bases and distract the Guardians while Cy-Kill, Crasher and Scorp attempt to take the suits from the Command Center. Small Foot and Scooter are able to delay the Renegades until Leader-1 and Turbo return to chase away the Renegades. Realizing he is a better Guardian with his holo projector, Scooter has it reinstalled.

Small Foot investigates the Renegade escape from the Gobot Prison Moon.

In "The Fall of Gobotron" episode #43 after Cy-Kill takes over Gobotron, Geeper-Creeper and Slicks are assigned to guard the modifier. They are lured away by Scooter and lead into a Guardian ambush by Turbo, Small Foot and Sparky.

Small Foot appears in "Flight to Earth" episode #44.

Small Foot appears in "Return of Gobotron" episode #45. She witnesses the Last Engineer creating new Power Suits for the Guardians. She is later given one of the Power Suits, which features enhanced sensors. She combines with the other suits and the Last Engineer's ship to form the Power Warrior Courageous and defeat a fleet of Thrusters.

Small Foot appears in GoBots: Battle of the Rock Lords.

 Fun Publications 
Sent to investigate the effect the destroying their universe six Gobots (including Small Foot) are reformatted to look like an Autobots and Decepticons and sent through the Interfacer to the source of the disturbance - the 22nd level. They accidentally arrive on Transtech Cybertron where they are kept against their will in the city of Axiom Nexus. Bug Bite escapes without his allies using an astro beam device. The remaining Gobots run afoul of the Transtech Decepticon General Demolishor in a criminal investigation but are aided by Airazor, Crystal Widow and Cheetor. The Gobots receive upgrades from the shop of Swindle, Swindle and Swindle and are able to leave the dimension thanks to stolen transit passes they obtain. Once they arrive on Earth of the 22nd level where they find Bug Bite and his new Decepticon allies Weirdwolf and Dreadwind.

Small Foot has a cameo in Transcendent which occurred at the same time as Withered Hope. She can be seen standing in line for processing in Axiom Nexus.

 Toys 
 Gobots Small Foot (1985)
 Turns into a Toyota Hilux.

 Generation 1 Mini-Bot Small Foot (2004)
 Small Foot is an e-hobby exclusive. She was a redeco of Generation 1 Gears.

 Spay-C Spay-C, also known as SpaceShuttleMan or simply ShuttleMan, is a Guardian Gobot who turns into a Space Shuttle.

 Spoons 

Spoons is one of the soldiers of the Renegade leader Cy-Kill. He turns into a forklift. Spoons was the inspiration for the Transformers Decepticon Deadlift.

 Animated series 
Spoons appears in the episode #23, called "Doppelganger". He worked with Doctor Go (aka Herr Fiend) in transporting a robot duplicate of Leader-1 the doctor had created. Later when the Guardians are escaping Renegade capture Fitor and Spoons try to stop them, but fail.

 Staks 
Staks is a Guardian Gobot who turns into a semi-trailer truck.

 Animated series 
Staks appears in "Auto Madic" episode #28, where he dons a Power Suit and helped form the Power Warrior Courageous, which defeats Puzzler.

 Tank 

TankMan, or simply Tank, is one of Cy-Kill's minons. His great physical strength and firepower mean he is often used to support the Renegades' operations. Tank is larger than most Gobots, and has considerable firepower. In tank mode, he can drive through walls or over cars without it even slowing him. His physical attributes are outweighed by his low intelligence.

 Animated series 
Tank first appeared in the Challenge of the Gobots series pilot.

He was placed in command of the mind-controlled US. Army during Cy-Kill's first attempt to invade Earth, but was unable to successfully hunt down Turbo and Scooter in New York. Soon afterwards, he returned to Gobotron and was captured along with the other Renegades based in their fortress.

Tank appeared in "Flight to Earth" episode 44. Tank appeared in "Return of Gobotron" episode 45. In "Destroy All Guardians" episode 47 Geeper-Creeper and Tank were seen among Cy-Kill's guards on the Roguestar.

 Eagle Comics 
Tank appeared in the Eagle Comics story The Robo Machines. He is a member of the Renegade Robo Machines working for Strom Domez.

 Tork 
Tork is a Guardian and one of the Secret Riders who turns into a Ford Ranger.

 Reception 
Tork was chosen as the 5th goofiest Gobot name by Topless Robot.

 Treds 

Treds, also spelled "Treads", is one of the Guardian Gobots. He was featured in a 1986 Gobots commercial where he was named as one of the new Guardians along with Mr. Moto. He turns into a M1 Abrams tank, and later a M551 Sheridan light tank.

 Animated series 
Treds appears in "Et Tu Cy-Kill?" episode #60, where he and Tri-Trak help Leader-1's team track down the Renegades on an alien planet.

 Fun Publications 
Treds is a main character appearing in Fun Publications fiction Withered Hope, a text and comic-based story. Sent to investigate the effect the destroying their universe six Gobots are reformatted to look like an Autobots and Decepticons and sent through the Interfacer to the source of the disturbance - the 22nd level. Treds was chosen to imitate a Decepticon so he could keep an eye on the Renegades Bad Boy and Bug Bite. They accidentally arrive on Transtech Cybertron where they are kept against their will in the city of Axiom Nexus. Bug Bite escapes without his allies using an astro beam device. The remaining Gobots run afoul of the Transtech Decepticon General Demolishor in a criminal investigation but are aided by Airazor, Crystal Widow and Cheetor. The Gobots receive upgrades from the shop of Swindle, Swindle and Swindle and are able to leave the dimension thanks to stolen transit passes. Once they arrive on Earth of the 22nd level where they find Bug Bite and his new Decepticon allies Weirdwolf and Dreadwind.

Treds has a cameo in Transcendent which occurred at the same time as Withered Hope. He can be seen standing in line for processing in Axiom Nexus.

 Toys 
Two toys were produced for Treds. The first was released as a Gobot. The second as a Transformer, which was a recolor of the Autobot Warpath.

 Turbo 

 Vamp 

Vamp is a female Renegade Gobot who works for Cy-Kill. She can fire blasts of energy from her eyes.

Vamp and Scooter were featured on the cover of issue #2 of the Gobots Magazine.

 Animated series 
Creepy, Scorp and Vamp aided the Master Renegade from escaping his imprisonment by Cy-Kill on Roguestar.

 Comics 
Vamp appeared in the story "Scooter's Mighty Magnet" as one of Cy-Kill's minions.

 Eagle Comics 
Vamp appeared Casmodon in the Eagle Comics story The Robo Machines. He was one of the Devil Invaders.

 Water Walk 
Water Walk was one of the names in a word find that had to be solved to win a copy of the Challenge of the Gobots video game from Your Sinclair magazine.

 Reception 
Water Walk was chosen as the 6th goofiest Gobot name by Topless Robot.

 Zeemon 

Zeemon is one of the Guardians. He is a prominent Guardian leader.

 Animated series 
Zeemon first appears in the Challenge of the Gobots series pilot. He is among the leaders of the Guardians planning to stop the Renegades. Due to animation errors the Renegade Herr Fiend appears identical to Zeemon in the pilot series.

Zeemon appears in "Lost on Gobotron" episode #11. Zeemon appears in "Genius and Son" episode #17. He plans to surrender the planet to Cy-Kill to avoid it being destroyed by the Renegade. In "Doppleganger" episode #23, the real Guardians were able to defeat their duplicates with the aid of the real Zeemon, Hans-Cuff and Rest-Q. Zeemon appears in "Nova Beam" episode #54 working with Staks and Pathfinder on Gobotron when information came in that the sun of the planet Nirolac had become unstable. Zeemon appears in "Et Tu Cy-Kill?" episode 60. Zeemon appears in GoBots: Battle of the Rock Lords. Due to animation errors he sometimes is depicted as the Renegade Herr Fiend.

 Zod 

The Zod Monster is a fictional character in the Gobots and Machine Robo story and toy line.

Zod is a giant, even among his fellow Gobots. Savage and bestial, he is one of Cy-Kill's pets and most powerful weapons. Zod is considered the Godzilla-like deity of the Gobots.

 Animated series 
Zod is left on Gobotron during Cy-Kill's initial trip to Earth. He orders Fitor to not use Zod against the Guardians, as he will have use of him later.

The Power Warrior Courageous defeats Ultra Zod.

Scooter used a hologram of Zod to make the Renegades flee.

 Robo Machines 
In the Eagle comic strip Robo Machines, Cy-Kill performed an operation on his master to convert him into Zod. Zod attacked the Command Centre, shooting down Royal-T, and later killing Carry-All. Zod still possessed the intellect of Stron-Domez, and was able to design the Devil Invaders, and oversee construction of the first Casmodon. However, soon after his stabilisers were disabled after being attacked by the Security Forces, and Cy-Kill abandoned him.

 Toys 
 Gobots'' Zod
 A motorized toy. Came with a lance that could deactivate him by pressing a button on his chest.

See also 
Lists of Transformers characters

References 

Fictional cyborgs
Lists of fictional extraterrestrial characters
Fictional shapeshifters by franchise
Gobots
Lists of characters in American television animation
Lists of animated science fiction television characters
Lists of toy characters